Telecurso is a television program of distance education in Brazil, made by an agreement of Padre Anchieta Foundation, Fundação Roberto Marinho and FIESP. It debuted in 1978, and was exhibited by Rede Globo until 2014. The program is still aired on Futura, TV Cultura, TV Brasil, TV Aparecida, Rede Vida, and SBT.

The idea of this program was created by journalist Francisco Calazans Fernandes and it featured several kinds of education classes.

Broadcast history
Educational programming began to be broadcast by Rede Globo on 16 January 1978 when the secondary-school oriented Telecurso 2o Grau started broadcasting; it was initially created by Rede Globo in conjunction with the Padre Anchieta Foundation (Fundação Padre Anchieta) and the Roberto Marinho Foundation. Unlike almost all other programs shown by Rede Globo, the program was presented commercial-free for its entire run due to its educational nature, although promos for the network's shows and public service announcements were still shown in between segments of the program. In 1981, Telecurso was expanded from 15 to 30 minutes with the launch of Telecurso 1o Grau, which concentrated on educational lessons for elementary school children.

In 1986, the Roberto Marinho Foundation retitled the original program as Novo Telecurso 2o Grau and a new partnership was obtained with Bradesco; the courses featured were authorized to become a valid form of educative material in schools around Brazil, as well as in certain companies. On 2 January 1995, the entire educational programming block was rebranded as Telecurso 2000 and expanded to 45 minutes with the launch of Telecurso 2000 Profissionalizante (which focused on vocational subjects).

On 31 March 2008, the program was reformatted as Novo Telecurso, which removed outdated segments of geography and history that were no longer being used and replaced them with philosophy, visual arts, music, theatre, sociology, and Spanish language topics that were aimed at secondary students who have not completed their education. In 2009, a new partnership was attained with SENAI-SP for the vocational segments of the program.

On 28 November 2014, Telecurso aired for the last time on Rede Globo. It was replaced by Hora Um, an early-morning news program that premiered on 1 December 2014. The daily edition of Globo Rural aired the last time on the same day; the weekly edition currently airs on Sundays at 8:00 am.

See also
Organizações Globo
Padre Anchieta Foundation
Rede Globo

References

External links 
 
 Biblioteca Virtual da USP, Telecurso 2000

Brazilian television series
Portuguese-language television
Brazilian educational television series
Educational and instructional television channels
1978 Brazilian television series debuts
1970s Brazilian television series
1980s Brazilian television series
1990s Brazilian television series
2000s Brazilian television series